Persepolis F.C. (Persian: پرسپولیس)  is an Iranian professional football club based in Tehran. Although Persepolis Athletic and Cultural Club was founded in 1963, Persepolis F.C. started in 1968 following dissolution of Shahin F.C. in 1967. Parviz Dehdari and Masoud Boroumand transferred the popularity of Shahin to Persepolis F.C. by taking most Shahin Players to join Persepolis.

The club has won a total of 24 trophies at the national level, comprising the Iranian Top-tier Football Leagues a record of 14 times, Hazfi Cup 6 times and recently developed tournament, Iranian Super Cup, a record of 4 times and also won the 1979 Espandi Cup. It has also won 11 regional trophies, which are the Tehran Provincial League 7 times, and Tehran Hazfi Cup a record of 4 times. In the continental level, Persepolis F.C. has won 1 title of Asian Cup Winners' Cup and participated three other continental finals in both Asian Cup Winners' Cup in 1992–93 and AFC Champions League in 2018 and 2020.

This list details the club's achievements.

National titles
Iranian Football League (Record)

Winners (14): 1971–72, 1973–74, 1975–76, 1995–96, 1996–97, 1998–99 *, 1999–2000, 2001–02, 2007–08, 2016–17, 2017–18, 2018–19 *, 2019–20, 2020–21 
Runners-up (9): 1974–75, 1976–77, 1977–78, 1989–90, 1992–93, 1993–94, 2000–01, 2013–14, 2015–16
(* Won League title and Hazfi Cup)

Hazfi Cup
Winners (6): 1987–88, 1990–91, 1998–99 *, 2009–10, 2010–11, 2018–19 *
Runners-up (2): 2005–06, 2012–13
(* Won League title and Hazfi Cup)

Super Cup (Record)
Winners (4): 2017, 2018, 2019, 2020
Runners-up (1): 2021

Espandi Cup (Record)Winners (1): 1979

 Provincial titlesTehran Province LeagueWinners (7): 1982–83, 1986–87 ♦, 1987–88, 1988–89, 1989–90, 1990–91, 2011–12♦
Runner-up (4): 1970–71, 1981–82, 1983–84, 1991–92
(* Won League title and Hazfi Cup)Tehran Hazfi Cup Winners (4): 1978–79, 1981–82, 1986–87♦, 2011–12♦
Runners-up (2): 1968–69, 1980–81
(* Won League title and Hazfi Cup)

 Continental titlesAFC Champions League:

Runners-up (2): 2018, 2020Asian Club Championship:
Third place (3): 1996–97, 1999–00, 2000–01  
Fourth place (1): 1997–98Asian Cup Winners' Cup:Winner (1): 1990–91
Runners-up (1): 1992–93

Other awards 
IFFHS continental clubs of the 20th century
4th Place

Iranian Team of the year
2007–08
2016–17
2017–18
2018–19

Best Fan Club
2012–13

Fair play award
2018 AFC Champions League

References

Honours